Acısu can refer to:

 Acısu, Beypazarı
 Acısu, Sarayköy